Xenobolus carnifex is a species of spirobolidan millipede found in South India and Sri Lanka. It is a common species and can become a household pest, infesting and damaging thatched roofs, creating a "continual shower of faecal pellets", and invading food and water supplies. The body color is dark or black, with a band of red or pink running down the dorsal midline.

References

Spirobolida
Millipedes of Asia
Arthropods of India
Arthropods of Sri Lanka
Pest arthropods
Taxa named by Johan Christian Fabricius
Animals described in 1775